Stanisław Ziffer (born 1 August 1904, died between 1939 and 1945) was a Polish long-distance runner. He competed in the men's 5000 metres at the 1924 Summer Olympics. He was killed during World War II.

References

External links
 

1904 births
Year of death missing
Athletes (track and field) at the 1924 Summer Olympics
Polish male long-distance runners
Polish male steeplechase runners
Olympic athletes of Poland
Place of birth missing
Polish military personnel killed in World War II